Rolf Olsen (born April 27, 1938) is a Norwegian sprint canoer who competed in the 1960s. Competing in two Summer Olympics, he earned his best finish of sixth in K-1 1000 m event at Rome in 1960.

References
Sports-reference.com profile

1938 births
Canoeists at the 1960 Summer Olympics
Canoeists at the 1968 Summer Olympics
Living people
Norwegian male canoeists
Olympic canoeists of Norway